All About Love is the second album by American singer-songwriter Joyce Sims, released in 1989. The album includes two singles: "Looking for a Love" (No. 51 on the US Hot R&B/Hip-Hop Songs chart, No. 39 in the UK Singles Chart) and the title track "All About Love" (No. 69 on Hot R&B/Hip-Hop Songs, No. 34 on Dance Club Songs chart).

Track listing
All tracks written by Joyce Sims, except where noted.

Note
 Some versions of the album feature the tracks in a different order.

Charts

References

External links
All About Love at Discogs

1989 albums
Joyce Sims albums
Sleeping Bag Records albums
FFRR Records albums